This is list of members of the Argentine Senate from 10 December 2005 to 9 December 2007.

Composition
as of 9 December 2007

Senate leadership

Election cycles

List of senators

Notes

References

External links
List on the official website (archived) 

2005-2007
2005 in Argentina
2006 in Argentina
2007 in Argentina